

Gottfried Ludwig Weber (31 January 1899 – 16 August 1958) was a German general (Generalleutnant) in the Wehrmacht during World War II. He was a recipient of the  Knight's Cross of the Iron Cross with Oak Leaves of Nazi Germany.

Weber surrendered to the Soviet forces in May 1945 in the Courland Pocket. Convicted in the Soviet Union as a war criminal, he was held until 1955. In 1956 Weber joined the Bundeswehr, reaching the rank of a Generalmajor. He died on 16 August 1958 in an automobile collision in Villach, Austria.

Awards and decorations
 Iron Cross (1939) 2nd Class (27 September 1939) & 1st Class (20 October 1939)
 German Cross in Gold on 16 February 1943 as Oberst in Grenadier-Regiment 176
 Knight's Cross of the Iron Cross with Oak Leaves
 Knight's Cross on 13 October 1941 as Major and commander of I./Infanterie-Regiment 162
 490th Oak Leaves on 9 June 1944 as Generalmajor and commander of 12. Luftwaffen-Feld-Division

References

Citations

Bibliography

 
 
 

1899 births
1958 deaths
Lieutenant generals of the German Army (Wehrmacht)
German Army generals of World War II
German Army personnel of World War I
People from the Province of Silesia
Recipients of the Gold German Cross
Recipients of the Knight's Cross of the Iron Cross with Oak Leaves
German prisoners of war in World War II held by the Soviet Union
Military personnel from Wrocław
Road incident deaths in Austria
Major generals of the German Army